Asahi Dam may refer to the following dams in Japan, by prefecture:

Asahi Dam (Fukushima)
Asahi Dam (Gifu)
Asahi Dam (Nara)